ITTF Tournament of Champions was a table tennis tournament held in Changsha, China in 2006 to 2009 which was organized by International Table Tennis Federation and Chinese Table Tennis Association.

Medalists

Men's singles

Women's singles

References 
2006年国球大典_NIKE新浪竞技风暴_新浪网 
2007年国球大典_NIKE新浪竞技风暴_新浪网 
2008国球大典_竞技风暴_新浪网 
2009年国球大典_竞技风暴_新浪网 

Table tennis competitions